Abike is a Yoruba name common in Nigeria. It means “One who is born to be cared for” or “One who is born to be pampered”.

Notable people with the name 

 Abike Dabiri, Nigerian politician
 Faridah Àbíké-Íyímídé, British Nigerian writer
 Abike Funmilola Egbeniyi, Nigerian sprinter

References 

Nigerian names
Yoruba